The 2000 Basingstoke and Deane Council election took place on 4 May 2000 to elect members of Basingstoke and Deane Borough Council in Hampshire, England. One third of the council was up for election and the council stayed under no overall control.

After the election, the composition of the council was
Conservative 24
Liberal Democrats 15
Labour 15
Independent 3

Election result
Overall turnout in the election was 29%.

References

2000
2000 English local elections
2000s in Hampshire